Hedenäset is a locality situated in Övertorneå Municipality, Norrbotten County, Sweden with 270 inhabitants in 2010.

References

External links

Populated places in Övertorneå Municipality
Norrbotten